Century: Spice Road is a 2017 table-top strategy game designed by Emerson Matsuuchi and distributed by Plan B Games.  The game is a simulation of fifteenth-century spice trading, and each player competes for points as they buy and sell spices represented by colored cubes.

Gameplay
Each turn, a player will play a card, buy a card, or take back into their hand cards they had previously discarded. By doing so, the player builds a hand of cards that enable the player to collect or upgrade spices to fill orders that score points for the player.

Reception
The game has received positive reviews.  The Guardian calls Century: Spice Road "slick and fast-paced," noting also that the game's "speed and simplicity mask some real depth."  Owen Duffy of Ars Technica calls it a "tight, brain-teasing card game." The New Indian Express describes the game as "clever," also praising the game's pace, a facet encouraged by the focus on series of small, quick decisions as opposed to offering many options to consider simultaneously. The game currently holds a rating of 7.4 on the website BoardGameGeek. 

Another review at Ars Technica states that it is "slightly more complex" than Splendor, and that it is "an absolute joy to play".

Expansions
Two official Century Spice Road mini-expansions have been published as Bonus Cards Sets with unique mechanisms to introduce new strategies.

References

External links
 Century: Spice Road on PlanBGames.com.
 Designer Emerson Matsuuchi on BoardGameGeek.com.

Board games about history